House Hunting Mice is a 1947 Warner Bros. Looney Tunes cartoon short directed by Chuck Jones and co-written by Michael Maltese and Tedd Pierce. The short was released on September 6, 1947, and features Hubie and Bertie.

House Hunting Mice, among many other animated shorts, features the song "Powerhouse" by Raymond Scott when the automated sweeping robots pursue the two mice. This cartoon is also the first Warner Bros. cartoon to have its color process in Cinecolor since Beauty and the Beast.

Plot
Outside a model "home of tomorrow" designed by Frank Lloyd Wrong, Hubie calls up Bertie and chides him for wearing a flower on his head.  In the hopes of finding a home with plenty of food, the mice head on up to the House of Tomorrow.  Upon entry, they step on the welcome mat, which activates an audio recording that welcomes visitors to the House of Tomorrow and invites them to try out the many gadgets the house provides.  At first, Bertie is scared by the recording and tries to run away, but Hubie stops him and points out that this is the perfect place for them as everything for them can be provided at the touch of a button.

As a demonstration, Hubie pushes a button to the Automatic Record Player: the record player rises up out of the floor, a robotic arm on a table picks out a record disc from a collection of records and tosses it like a frisbee, and two robotic arms (one of them has a catcher's mitt) catch the record, put it on the turntable, and start playing the record.  Hubie and Bertie then start dancing to the music that plays, until Hubie spies a button that demonstrates the Automatic Sweeper.  Upon pressing the button, a cigarette lighter lights a cigar, a robotic puffer puffs the cigar, and a robotic arm taps the cigar ash on to the floor.  This summons the Robot Sweeper, a robot armed with a broom and having a dustpan near its wheels, that comes out, sweeps up the ash into its dustpan, sweeps it into the refuse bin, and returns to its closet.

Impressed by what Hubie meant by the perfect house, Bertie insists on pushing the next button they come across, but Hubie slaps him and states that he himself will be pushing the buttons as Bertie isn't smart enough to do so.  As the mice go up onto the kitchen counter where some unlabeled buttons are, Bertie again requests to push a button.  Hubie gives in, but (out of fear that whatever button Bertie presses might hurt him) gets a safe distance away on the other side of the kitchen before giving Bertie the A-OK.  Bertie presses a button, where a light next to it reveals it's the laundry button.  This makes a vacuum appear above a hamper, where Hubie just happens to be, and suck up Hubie and the laundry.  Bertie then cringes and shakes as, offscreen (and to the tune of "Here we go round the mulberry bush"), Hubie goes through the washing, rinsing, mangling, ironing, and folding processes.  The laundry is then returned all pressed and ironed, with Hubie (looking pressed and ironed himself) at the top.  As a result, Hubie slaps Bertie for putting him through that.

The laundry incident is quickly forgotten when both mice spy a button labeled "Cheese Dispenser".  When Hubie presses the button, a wheel of cheese flies out, but crashes to the floor, which summons the Sweeper to come out, sweep up the mess, and put it in the bin.  To prevent losing the second wheel of cheese, Hubie arranges for Bertie to stand by to catch the cheese with a plate.  Straight after Hubie presses the button, another wheel of cheese flies out, but crashes on top of Bertie and the plate.  Again, the Sweeper comes out, sweeps up the mess and Bertie, sweeps them into the bin, and return to its closet.  Bertie escapes the bin, but thinking that Bertie is "escaping refuse", the Sweeper comes back out, sweeps up Bertie again, sweeps him back into the bin, and returns to its closet.  Twice, Bertie peeks out, but the Sweeper sticks its head out as if to say "Oh, no you don't!"

Seeing this, Hubie comes up with a plan to rescue Bertie.  He does this by taking a large vase up to the house's second floor and tossing it out the window, where it crashes to the ground.  As expected, the Sweeper takes the bait, rushes up to the second floor (allowing Bertie to escape), and jumps out the window where it too crashes to the ground.  Afterwards, Bertie is thanking Hubie for saving him when the doorbell rings and Bertie answers it.  It's the Sweeper (looking battered from its fall) and, as a way of saying "Nobody tricks me into jumping out of a window and gets away with it", it sweeps up Bertie again, sweeps him back into the bin, and returns to its closet.

Coming up with another plan to save Bertie, Hubie pushes a box full of dynamite and fireworks off a shelf and onto the floor.  Detecting the new mess, the Sweeper leaves its closet (allowing Bertie to escape again), sweeps up the explosives, and sweeps them into the bin.  Hubie then pushes a lit candle and its holder off the shelf and onto the floor, once more making the Sweeper fall for the ruse.  The Sweeper sweeps up the candle and sweeps it into the bin, but the lit candle makes contact with the explosives already in the bin and they blow up on the Sweeper.  The Sweeper rolls away (dazed and severely damaged by the explosion) and breaks apart to pieces on the floor, but its hand presses a button labeled "Repair Service".  This summons the Robot Medic, a hodgepodge looking robot with pincers, a hammer, and a crane arm.  The Robot Medic leaves the same closet the Sweeper resides in, rebuilds the Sweeper offscreen, and both robots return to their closet.

To really drive the Sweeper crazy, Hubie and Bertie nail the floor doors of the Automatic Record Player shut so that when Hubie presses the button, the record player can't rise up out of the floor.  The robotic arm still picks out a record and tosses it, but with nothing to catch it, the record crashes against the wall and breaks into pieces which land on the floor, thus summoning the Sweeper to clean up the mess.  Hubie then increases the robotic arm's speed to fast, thus making the robotic arm toss the records at the wall faster than ever before.  The Sweeper returns to clean up the mess from the next record, but soon finds itself facing flying records that smash against the wall and tries to keep with cleaning up one mess after another.  Soon, the Sweeper's dustpan is so full of broken record pieces that when it tries to empty them into the bin, they just bury the bin.  Fed up with the ever increasing messes, the Sweeper dons a coat and hat, picks up a briefcase, puts an "I Quit!" sign on its closet door, and leaves the house.

Hubie starts to revel in their victory over the Sweeper, but the victory is short lived when Bertie spies a button labeled "Spring Cleaning Service" and stupidly pushes it.  This ends up summoning a whole army of Robot Sweepers that come straight out of another closet and begin cleaning up the place.  Hubie and Bertie try to escape the onslaught, but get caught up in a carpet being rolled up by one of the Sweepers and taken outside.  In the cartoon's final scene, as the Sweepers begin the carpet beating process and whack the mice in the process, Hubie says "HEY, BOIT!  C'MERE!" and starts repeatedly slapping Bertie for getting them into this recent mess.

References

External links

1947 films
1947 animated films
1947 short films
Short films directed by Chuck Jones
Looney Tunes shorts
Warner Bros. Cartoons animated short films
Cinecolor films
Animated films about animals
Animated films about mice
Films scored by Carl Stalling
1940s Warner Bros. animated short films
Films with screenplays by Michael Maltese
Hubie and Bertie films